Antipode or Antipodes may refer to:

Mathematics
 Antipodal point, the diametrically opposite point on a circle or n-sphere, also known as an antipode
 Antipode, the convolution inverse of the identity on a Hopf algebra

Geography
 Antipodes, points on the Earth's surface that are diametrically opposed
 Antipodes Islands, inhospitable volcanic islands south of New Zealand
 Antipodes, a term for Australia and New Zealand, roughly the area known as Australasia, based on their rough proximity to the antipodes of Britain

Arts and media
 Antipode (journal), progressive social science general
 Antipodes (sculpture) by Jim Sanborn
 The Antipodes, a c. 1640 stage play by Richard Brome
 Antipodes, journal of the American Association for Australian Literary Studies
 Risley (circus act), a circus skill that involves juggling with one's feet while lying on one's back, also known as antipode

Other uses
 Antipode or Abarimon, mythical creature with feet turned backwards
 Antipodes (submarine), a commercial submarine built in 1973
 Antipodes Water Company, a premium bottled water brand
 Enantiomer, a molecule that has a mirror image of itself, formerly known as antipode
 Antipode, a supersonic business aircraft concept by Charles Bombardier
 Antipodes, mental states described by Aldous Huxley in the essay "Heaven and Hell"

See also
 Antipodean (disambiguation)